FC Spartak-Bratskiy Yuzhny was a Russian football team from Yuzhny, Rostov Oblast. It played professionally from 1994 to 1997. Their best result was 4th place in Zone 2 of the Russian Third League in 1996 and 1997.

External links
  Team history at KLISF

Association football clubs established in 1994
Association football clubs disestablished in 1998
Defunct football clubs in Russia
Sport in Rostov Oblast
1994 establishments in Russia
1998 disestablishments in Russia